La Voz del Interior is a daily Spanish language newspaper edited and published in Córdoba, capital of the province of Córdoba, Argentina and the second-largest city in the country. The newspaper is the leading daily in Córdoba, and one of the most important in the country outside of Buenos Aires.

History
La Voz was founded on March 15, 1904, by Silvestre Rafael Remonda and Juan Dionisio Naso, its first director.

Its production process and layout were completely redesigned on September 21, 1995. The composition process was computerized, and the paper itself was thereafter printed on a Goss Headliner press, in full color. One year later the online version of La Voz del Interior, called Intervoz, was started (its name was changed to La Voz on line in 2000 and to La Voz.com.ar in 2006). La Voz was acquired by the Clarín Group, the largest media conglomerate in Argentina  and use the largest newspaper format characterized by long vertical pages called broadsheet, in 1997. Dynamic updates with breaking news were introduced in 2001, along with a new format.

Circulation
La Voz had a circulation of 65,000 copies in 2000. According to third-party web analytics providers Alexa and SimilarWeb, La Vozs website is the 51st and 92nd most visited in Argentina respectively, as of August 2015. SimilarWeb rates the site as the 10th most visited news website in Argentina, attracting almost 5 million visitors per month.

Criticism 
A controversy arose at the daily during the 2008 Argentine government conflict with the agricultural sector, whereby columnist Enrique Lacolla was censored and ultimately fired before publishing a column opposing landowner lockouts titled "sedition of the agricultural sector." CISPREN (Círculo Sindical de la Prensa y la Comunicación de Córdoba, Circle Press Association and the Communication of Córdoba) condemned the episode.

References

External links
 Online edition: La Voz.com.ar
 History of La Voz del Interior

Spanish-language newspapers
Daily newspapers published in Argentina
Córdoba Province, Argentina
Publications established in 1904
Clarín Group
Argentine news websites